The Enhanced Background Checks Act is a proposed United States law that would strengthen background check procedures done before a federal firearms licensee may transfer a firearm to a person who does not have a federal firearms license.

Background 
In the United States, access to guns is controlled by law under a number of federal statutes. These laws regulate the manufacture, trade, possession, transfer, record keeping, transport, and destruction of firearms, ammunition, and firearms accessories. They are enforced by state agencies and the federal Bureau of Alcohol, Tobacco, Firearms and Explosives (ATF).

In addition to federal gun laws, all state governments and some local governments have their own laws that regulate firearms.

The right to keep and bear arms is protected by the Second Amendment to the United States Constitution.

Provisions

Legislative history 
As of March 15, 2021:

See also 
 List of bills in the 116th United States Congress
 List of bills in the 117th United States Congress

References 

Proposed legislation of the 116th United States Congress
Proposed legislation of the 117th United States Congress